The Qt Company (pronounced "cute"; formerly Trolltech and Quasar Technologies) is a software company based in Espoo, Finland. It oversees the development of its Qt application framework within the Qt Project. It was formed following the acquisition of Qt by Digia, but was later spun off into a separate, publicly traded company.

It has core R&D in Oslo, Norway, as well as large engineering teams in Berlin, Germany, and Oulu, Finland. The Qt Group operates in China, Finland, Germany, Japan, South Korea, Norway, the US, France, UK, Italy and India.

Products
The company provides software development platforms and frameworks, as well as expert consulting services. Its flagship product is Qt, a multi-platform Graphical User Interface (GUI) framework written in C++. Qt is popular with application developers using C++ but is supported by bindings for other programming languages too, such as Python. Qt also includes packages such as data structures and a networking library. The popular free and cross-platform KDE Plasma desktop environment and software compilation uses the Qt library. The company also employs several KDE developers.

In 2001 Trolltech introduced Qtopia which is based on Qt. Qtopia is an application platform for Linux-based devices such as mobile phones, portable media players, and home media. It is also used in many non-consumer products such as medical instruments and industrial devices. Qtopia Phone Edition was released in 2004, and their Greenphone smartphone is based on this platform.

History
Trolltech was founded by Eirik Chambe-Eng and Haavard Nord on 4 March 1994. They started writing Qt in 1991, and since then Qt has steadily expanded and improved. Trolltech completed an initial public offering (IPO) on the Oslo Stock Exchange in July, 2006.

On 28 January 2008, Nokia Corporation announced that they had entered into an agreement that Nokia would make a public voluntary tender offer to acquire Trolltech. The total cost for Nokia was approximately €104 million. On 5 June 2008 Nokia's voluntary tender offer was approved for all the shares in Trolltech. By 17 June 2008, Nokia had completed its acquisition of Trolltech. On 30 September 2008, Trolltech was renamed as Qt Software, and Qtopia was renamed as Qt Extended. On 11 August 2009, the company's name was changed to Qt Development Frameworks.

Nokia sold the commercial licensing business of Qt to Digia in March 2011. The remainder of the assets were subsequently acquired by Digia in 2012.

In September 2014, Digia formed The Qt Company, a wholly owned subsidiary dedicated to the development and governance of the Qt platform. In May 2016, the company went public on NASDAQ Helsinki as QTCOM.

References

External links
 
 Qt Marketplace

Companies formerly listed on the Oslo Stock Exchange
Companies listed on Nasdaq Helsinki
Computer companies of Finland
Finnish brands
Free software companies
Nokia assets
Qt (software)
Software companies of Finland
Software companies established in 1994
1994 establishments in Finland
2006 initial public offerings
Companies based in Espoo